Phantazia (Eileen Harsaw) is a fictional mutant supervillain appearing in American comic books published by Marvel Comics. The character first appeared in X-Force #6 (1992).

Fictional character biography
Phantazia was recruited by Toad into his lineup of the Brotherhood of Mutants. She was one of the more powerful members of the group, possessing a mutant ability that allowed her to manipulate and disrupt not only the electronic systems and weaponry of her opponents, but their physical senses and superhuman powers as well. Her first mission with the Brotherhood led her to battle the mutant strike force called X-Force. There, she easily located the team's hidden bunker, shut off Cable's weaponry, and disrupted Cannonball's blast field, allowing Sauron to stab him in the chest. 

After Thornn's defeat, Phantazia fled, leaving Masque to be killed by Shatterstar's sword.  Other missions set the Brotherhood up against X-Factor, Darkhawk, Spider-Man, and Sleepwalker Eventually, Phantazia was invited to Avalon, a mutant sanctuary, by Exodus. She rejected the offer and stayed with the Brotherhood. Pyro's sickness was getting to him, so they stayed with the mutant Empyrean, who could ward off Pyro's pain. The X-Men eventually found out what was going on and during the battle, Phantazia was defeated by a strike from Psylocke's psychic blade. After the skirmish, Phantazia departed the island with her teammates. Though the Brotherhood would make several appearances after this, she was not seen among their roster.

Phantazia was next seen in the altered reality of the 2005 "House of M" storyline. After the timeline was restored, she was confirmed as one of the many mutants who lost their powers on M-Day. She is held in S.H.I.E.L.D.'s psychological ward, apparently having been reduced to a partial catatonic state by the trauma of the reality shift. S.H.I.E.L.D. Director Maria Hill states in a conversation with Iron Man (Tony Stark) that Eileen has been muttering the words "House of M" repeatedly in her cell for some time after losing her powers.

Powers and abilities
Phantazia is a former mutant who possessed the ability to sense and manipulate electromagnetic energy fields.

Phantazia referred to her energy-based powers as "harmonizing." Phantazia was able to sense, manipulate, influence, and disrupt various fields along with various forms of energies and energy wavelengths to varying degrees. Though the upper limits of her powers were never clearly defined or fully explored, it is inferred that Phantazia could use her powers and abilities to create various electromagnetic phenomenon. Likewise, she can disrupt anything of an electromagnetic nature. Her mutations grant her the ability to levitate herself, presumably by creating an anti-gravity field around herself.

By disrupting the electrical fields of machinery, Phantazia could completely short-circuit the mechanical function, or control them to some degree; opening computer-locked doors, jamming weapon and targeting systems, and more. Phantazia is able to disrupt the bioelectric energy fields and nervous systems of living beings as well, resulting in pain, paralysis, and loss of physical coordination. In case of superhuman, her attacks can result in others powers spewing out uncontrollably as well as their inability to control their powers, causing them to fluctuate in strength, intensity, or even cease functioning altogether. She has, for example, disrupted the blast field of Cannonball, making him vulnerable, and also caused the superhero Sleepwalker to temporarily lose control of his reality-warping ability.  

Phantazia could also generate a masking effect, rendering herself and others near her undetectable to human senses and electronic surveillance. Her power grants her the ability to sense various forms of naturally occurring energy in her environment, such as electronic devices and the atmospheric distortion preceding a teleportation event.

Phantazia's powers required her conscious will to activate, as she was once caught off guard by a surprise energy blast from Darkhawk.

Other versions

Age of Apocalypse
Phantazia had a very brief appearance in the Age of Apocalypse storyline, in which she was one of the prisoners of Sinister's Breeding Pens. She was one of the countless victims of the Dark Beast's genetic experiments, to the point that she lost her hair and was too weak to use her powers. She tried to escape with other prisoners, but was quickly recaptured, being too weak to defend herself. She and her companions were returned to Dark Beast, who killed them by dissolving them into his genetic "soup".

House of M
Phantazia was seen as part of Magneto's elite guard. Phantazia was one of but a few people to remember the events of House of M, although this led to her going insane.

No More Humans
An alternate Earth version of Phantazia, with powers intact, assisted Raze's Brotherhood against the X-Men.

References

Characters created by Fabian Nicieza
Characters created by Rob Liefeld 
Comics characters introduced in 1992
Fictional characters who can turn invisible
Marvel Comics female supervillains
Marvel Comics mutants